Cymindis amicta is a species of ground beetle in the subfamily Harpalinae. It was described by Thomas Vernon Wollaston in 1864.

References

amicta
Beetles described in 1864